Alexandrovka is a rural locality (a village) in Novotroitsky Selsoviet, Chishminsky District, Bashkortostan, Russia. The population was 29 as of 2010. There are 2 streets.

Geography 
Alexandrovka is located 26 km south of Chishmy (the district's administrative centre) by road. Kuchumovo is the nearest rural locality.

References 

Rural localities in Chishminsky District